Philanthrocapitalism or philanthropic capitalism is a way of doing philanthropy, which mirrors the way that business is done in the for-profit world. It may involve venture philanthropy that actively invests in social programs to pursue specific philanthropic goals that would yield return on investment over the long term, or in a more passive form whereby "social investors" benefit from investing in socially-responsible programs.

History 
The term was coined by Matthew Bishop and Michael Green in their book Philanthrocapitalism: How the Rich Can Save The World. The book was endorsed by Bill Clinton, who wrote in its foreword that this concept drives the Clinton Foundation. The shift in implementing business models in charity is not a new concept – John D. Rockefeller and Andrew Carnegie sought to apply their business strategies in their philanthropy in the 20th century. Since then, a significant increase in charity spending by other organizations such as the Bill & Melinda Gates Foundation and Chan Zuckerberg Initiative, both described as examples of philanthrocapitalism, has been noted.

These more modern organizations differ from other groups or organizations since their funds come more from the private capital of an individual rather than donors or profit from physical products. The integration of business models in charity foundations has focused on a symbiotic relationship between social responsibility and the local, national, and international markets. Philanthrocapitalism has been compared and contrasted with altruism due to the similar stated goals of the movements’ advocates.

Criticism
There are many criticisms of philanthrocapitalism beginning with the limited transparency and accountability involved. There are also concerns that private philanthropy erodes support for governmental spending on public services. The main worry with this practice is that collectively, it can lead to tax revenue problems for the government. Donations are still going towards philanthropy, but some public services may not be able to utilize these funds because they may never receive them. Because of this, there is concern from John Cassidy that the wealth of a few may be able to determine what organizations receive the most funding.

Sociology professor Linsey McGoey has written that many current and past philanthropists amassed their fortunes by predatory business practices which  enhanced the very social problems their philanthropy is intended to alleviate. Finally there are concerns of the existence of ulterior motives. These ulterior motives can range from business owners avoiding capital-gains taxes by donating their company's excess stock instead of selling it and estate taxes which would be assessed onto their family to collecting tax credits from the government.

Limited liability companies 
Some philanthropists have decided to forego the Foundation route in favor of utilizing a limited liability company (LLC) to pursue their philanthropic goals. This allows the organization to avoid three main constrictions on Foundations. In December 2015, Mark Zuckerberg and his spouse Priscilla Chan pledged to donate over the decades  99% of their Facebook shares, then valued at $45 billion, to the Chan Zuckerberg Initiative, a newly created LLC with focuses on health and education.

Foundations must give away 5% of assets annually
Foundations must disclose where the grants are going and generally can only give to 501(c)(3) registered charities
Foundations must avoid funding or even advocating for a side in politics

The LLC structure allows the philanthropist to keep their initiatives private although there is no requirement that they do. An LLC is allowed to support for-profit companies that they feel support their mission. And the LLC, therefore, permitted to make and keep any profits made on such an investment. Lastly, an LLC can openly support politicians with whom they agree and advocate for policy positions and even author such policy positions elected officials may opt to use. Lastly, the original donor, such as Zuckerberg, retains control over the shares donated. Had he donated shares to a Foundation, they would no longer be his to control.

A Partial List of Philanthropic LLCs:
Chan Zuckerberg Initiative
Arnold Ventures LLC
Omidyar Network
Emerson Collective

See also
Impact investing
Social entrepreneurship
Microfinance

References

Sources
 The Economist, "The Birth of Philanthrocapitalism".
 Matthew Bishop and Michael Green, Philanthrocapitalism: How the Rich Can Save The World, http://www.philanthrocapitalism.net
 
 A debate about philanthrocapitalism has run on Opendemocracy.net and another on the Global Philanthropy Forum at https://www.philanthropyforum.org/forum/Discussion_Forum1.asp
 

Philanthropy
Social finance